Saudia, formerly known as Saudi Arabian Airlines, is the flag carrier of Saudi Arabia, based in Jeddah. The airline's main operational base is at King Abdulaziz International Airport in Jeddah. King Khalid International Airport in Riyadh and King Fahd International Airport in Dammam are secondary hubs. It operates domestic and international scheduled flights to over 100 destinations in the Middle East, Africa, Asia, Europe and North America. Domestic and international charter flights are operated, mostly during the Ramadan and the Hajj season. It joined the SkyTeam airline alliance on 29 May 2012 becoming the first Persian Gulf carrier to join one of the three major airline alliances. Saudia is a member and one of the founders of the Arab Air Carriers Organization.

History

Early years

When U.S. President Franklin Delano Roosevelt presented a Douglas DC-3 as a gift to King Abdul Aziz Ibn Saud in 1945, the event marked the kingdom's gradual development of civil aviation. The nation's flag carrier, Saudia, was founded as Saudi Arabian Airlines in September 1945 as a fully owned government agency under the control of the Ministry of Defense, with TWA (Trans World Airlines) running the airline under a management contract.

The now-demolished Al-Kandara Airport, which was close to Jeddah, served as the flag carrier's main base. Among the airline's early operations was a special flight from Lydda (Lod) in Palestine (today in Israel, site of Ben-Gurion International Airport), a British Mandate at that time, to carry Hajj pilgrims to Jeddah. The airline used five DC-3 aircraft to launch scheduled operations on the Jeddah-Riyadh-Hofuf-Dhahran route in March 1947. Its first international service was between Jeddah and Cairo. Service to Beirut, Karachi and Damascus followed in early 1948. The following year the first of five Bristol 170s was received. These aircraft offered the airline the flexibility of carrying both passengers and cargo.

In 1962, the airline took delivery of two Boeing 720s, becoming the fourth Middle Eastern airline to fly jet aircraft, after Middle East Airlines and Cyprus Airways with the de Havilland Comet in 1960 and El Al with the Boeing 707 in 1961. On 19 February 1963, the airline became a registered company, with King Faisal of Saudi Arabia signing the papers that declared Saudia a fully independent company. DC-6s and Boeing 707s were later bought, and the airline joined the AACO, the Arab Air Carriers Organization. Services were started to Sharjah, Tehran, Khartoum, Mumbai, Tripoli, Tunis, Rabat, Geneva, Frankfurt, and London.

In the 1980s, a new livery was introduced. It comprised a white fuselage with green and blue stripes and a green tailfin. The carrier's name was changed to Saudia on 1 April 1972. Boeing 737s and Fokker F-28s were bought, with the 737s replacing the Douglas DC-9. The airline operated their first Boeing 747s service in 1977 when three Jumbo Jets were leased from Middle East Airlines and deployed on the London sector. The first all-cargo flights between Saudi Arabia and Europe were started, and Lockheed L-1011s and Fairchild FH-27s were introduced. New services, including the Arabian Express 'no reservation shuttle flights' between Jeddah and Riyadh. The Special Flight Services (SFS) was set up as a special unit of Saudia, and operates special flights for the royal family and government agencies. Service was also started to Rome, Paris, Muscat, Kano, and Stockholm. The Pan Am/Saudia joint service between Dhahran and New York City started on 3 February 1979.

In the 1980s services such as Saudia Catering began. Flights were started to Jakarta, Athens, Bangkok, Dhaka, Mogadishu, Nairobi, New York City, Madrid, Singapore, Manila, Delhi, Islamabad, Seoul, Baghdad, Amsterdam, Colombo, Nice, Lahore, Brussels, Dakar, Kuala Lumpur and Taipei. Horizon Class, a business class service, was established to offer enhanced service. Cargo hubs were built at Brussels and Taipei. Airbus A300s, Boeing 747s, and Cessna Citations were also added to the fleet, the Citations for the SFS service. In 1989 services to Larnaca and Addis Ababa began. On 1 July 1982, the first nonstop service from Jeddah to New York City was initiated with Boeing 747SP aircraft. This was followed by a Riyadh-New York route.

In the 1990s, services to Orlando, Chennai, Asmara, Washington, D.C., Johannesburg, Alexandria, Milan, Málaga (seasonal), and Sanaa (resumption) were introduced. Boeing 777s, MD-90s and MD-11s were introduced. New female flight attendant uniforms designed by Adnan Akbar were introduced. A new corporate identity was launched on 16 July 1996, featuring a sand colored fuselage with contrasting dark blue tailfin, the center of which featured a stylized representation of the House of Saud crest. The Saudia name was dropped in the identity revamp, with Saudi Arabian Airlines name used.

Development (2000s–2020s)
On 8 October 2000, Prince Sultan bin Abdulaziz Al Saud, the Saudi Minister of Defense and Aviation, signed a contract to conduct studies for the privatization of Saudi Arabian Airlines. In preparation for this, the airline was restructured to allow non-core units—including Saudia catering, ground handling services and maintenance as well as the Prince Sultan Aviation Academy in Jeddah—to be transformed into commercial units and profit centers. In April 2005, the Saudi government indicated that the airline may also lose its monopoly on domestic services.

In 2006, Saudia began the process of dividing itself into Strategic Business Units (SBU); the catering unit was the first to be privatized. In August 2007, Saudi Arabia's Council of Ministers approved the conversion of strategic units into companies. It is planned that ground services, technical services, air cargo and the Prince Sultan Aviation Academy, medical division, as well as the catering unit, will become subsidiaries of a holding company.

The airline reverted to its abbreviated English brand name Saudia (used from 1972 to 1996) from Saudi Arabian Airlines (historic name in use until 1971 and reintroduced in 1997) on 29 May 2012; the name was changed to celebrate the company's entry into the SkyTeam airline alliance on that day, and it was a part of a larger rebranding initiative.

Saudia received 64 new jets by the end of 2012 (6 from Boeing and 58 from Airbus). Another 8 Boeing 787-9 aircraft started to join the fleet in 2015.

In April 2016, Saudia announced the creation of a low-cost subsidiary, Flyadeal. The airline was launched as part of Saudia Group's SV2020 Transformation Strategy, which intends to transform the group's units into world-class organisations by 2020. Flyadeal serves domestic and regional destinations, began flights in mid-2017.

The Rise of Saudia (2020s–2030s)

In April 2021, Saudia Airlines announced that on April 19, it will try the mobile app developed by the International Air Transport Association (IATA) that helps passengers to manage their travel information and documents in a digital way.

In December 2021, Saudia was in talks with the two major aircraft manufacturers Airbus and Boeing in purchasing new wide-body aircraft, the airline will decide in early 2022 whether it will order the Airbus A350 or the Boeing 777X, or it might purchase more Boeing 787's instead. The airline also chose the CFM Leap engine to power its Airbus A321neo's which are expected to be delivered in 2024. The airline’s plan is to have 250 planes in it’s fleet by 2030..

In April 2022 services began to Seoul, Beijing, Batumi, Mykonos, Barcelona, Malaga, Bangkok, Chicago, Moscow, Entebbe and Kyiv. Services to Kyiv are currently delayed due to the 2022 Russian invasion of Ukraine. In June 2022, they reintroduced services to Zürich.  In July 2022 Saudia signed a contract with the Air Connectivity Programme to launch four new destinations to Zurich, Barcelona, Tunis and Kuala Lumpur.

In March 2023, Saudia ordered 39 Boeing 787s split between the -9 and -10 variants, with options for a further 10 aircraft.

Awards 
Saudia was named the World's Most Improved Airline' for 2017 and 2020 by SkyTrax.

Sponsorships 
Saudia was the main sponsor of the Williams Formula One team from 1977 to 1984.

Saudia was main sponsor of the 2018 and 2019 Diriyah ePrix. They are the official airline of Formula E, with one of their planes, a Boeing 777-300ER, painted in a special livery featuring an eagle head with the Spark SRT05e Gen2 car behind it.

In November 2022, Newcastle United announced Saudia as the club’s official tour airline partner.

In March 2023, Aston Martin F1 Team announced Saudia as the team's official global airline partner in a multi-year deal.

Destinations

Saudia operates to 102 destinations as of October 2022. Saudia's plan is to reach 250 destinations by 2030.
Saudia recently announced    destinations to Batumi, Chicago, Seoul, Bangkok, Beijing, Barcelona, Amsterdam, Moscow, Entebbe, Kyiv and Zürich. Seasonal destinations are also started including: Marrakech, Mykonos, Nice and Malaga.

Codeshare agreements
Saudia has codeshare agreements with SkyTeam partners and with the following airlines:

 Aeroflot
 Air France
 Czech Airlines
 Etihad Airways
 Garuda Indonesia
 Gulf Air
 ITA Airways
 Kenya Airways
 Korean Air
 KLM
 Malaysia Airlines
 Middle East Airlines
 Oman Air
 Royal Air Maroc
 Vietnam Airlines

Fleet

Current fleet

, the Saudia fleet consists of 151 aircraft. The following aircraft including its passenger and cargo fleet:

Historic fleet

Saudia formerly operated the following aircraft:

Other aircraft

Saudia Special Flight Services, VIP flights, and Private Aviation operate the following, a number of which sport the airline's livery

Some military C-130s are also painted with the Saudia colors and are flown by Royal Saudi Air Force crews to support Saudi official activities in the region and Europe. 
Since 2017 two mobile escalators (TEC Hünert MFT 500-01) travel with the King and transported by separate aircraft.

In 2021, the Saudi royal flight's single 747-400 registered as HZ-HM1 was painted in a new livery.

As of January 2022, all the Saudi royal flight aircraft are going to be operated by a private company, that's why all aircraft are to be painted in another livery soon.

In-flight services
The inflight magazine of Saudia is called Ahlan Wasahlan ( "Hello and Welcome"). No alcoholic beverages or pork are served on board in accordance with Islamic dietary laws. Its selected Airbus A320, Airbus A330-300, Boeing 787-9, Boeing 787-10, and Boeing 777-300ER aircraft are equipped with Wi-Fi and mobile network portability on board. Most aircraft also offer onboard specialized prayer areas and a recorded prayer is played prior to takeoff.

Incidents and accidents
 On 25 September 1959, a Saudia Douglas DC-4/C-54A-5-DO (registration HZ-AAF), performed a belly landing shortly after take-off from the old Jeddah Airport. The cause of the accident was gust locks not deactivated by the mechanic, followed by a stall. All 67 passengers and 5 crew survived.
 On 9 February 1968, a Douglas C-47 (reg. HZ-AAE) was damaged beyond economic repair at an unknown location.
 On 10 November 1970, a Douglas DC-3 on a flight from Amman Civil Airport, Jordan to King Khalid International Airport, Riyadh, Saudi Arabia was hijacked and diverted to Damascus Airport, Syria.
 On 11 July 1972, a Douglas C-47B (reg. HZ-AAK) was damaged beyond economic repair in an accident at Tabuk Airport.
 On 2 January 1976, Saudia Flight 5130, a McDonnell Douglas DC-10-30CF, leased from ONA undershot the runway at Istanbul, Turkey, crash landed, tearing off the #1 engine and causing the left wing to catch fire. All passengers and crew evacuated safely. The aircraft was written off.
 On 19 August 1980, Saudia Flight 163, a Lockheed L-1011-200 TriStar (HZ-AHK), operating Karachi-Riyadh-Jeddah, was completely destroyed by fire at Riyadh airport with the loss of all 301 people on board due to delays in evacuating the aircraft. This was the deadliest accident experienced by Saudia until 312 were killed in the loss of Flight 763 over 16 years later.
 On 22 December 1980, Saudia Flight 162, a Lockheed L-1011-200 TriStar, operating Dhahran to Karachi, experienced an explosive decompression, penetrating the passenger cabin. The hole sucked out two passengers and depressurized the cabin.
 On 5 April 1984, a Saudia Lockheed L-1011 TriStar on final approach to Damascus from Jeddah was hijacked by a Syrian national. The hijacker demanded to be taken to Istanbul, Turkey but changed his mind and requested to go to Stockholm, Sweden. After landing in Istanbul to refuel, the hijacker was arrested after the pilot pushed him out of the emergency exit.
 On 12 November 1996, a Saudia Boeing 747-100B (HZ-AIH), operating flight 763, was involved in the 1996 Charkhi Dadri mid-air collision. The aircraft was on its way from New Delhi, India, to Dhahran, Saudi Arabia when a Kazakhstan Airlines Ilyushin Il-76 (UN-76435) collided with it over the village of Charkhi Dadri, some miles west of New Delhi. Flight 763 was carrying 312 people, all of whom, along with 37 more on the Kazakh aircraft, died, for a grand total of 349 fatalities. The loss of Flight 763 alone remains Saudia's worst accident in terms of fatalities. The accident overall also remains the world's deadliest mid-air collision.
 On 14 October 2000, Saudia Flight 115, flying from Jeddah to London was hijacked en route by two men who claimed they were armed with explosives. The hijackers commandeered the Boeing 777-200ER (HZ-AKH) to Baghdad, Iraq, where all 90 passengers and 15 crew members were safely released. The two hijackers, identified as Lieutenant Faisal Naji Hamoud Al-Bilawi and First Lieutenant Ayesh Ali Hussein Al-Fareedi, both Saudi citizens, were arrested and later extradited to Saudi Arabia in 2003.
 On 23 August 2001, at Kuala Lumpur International Airport, Malaysia, a Boeing 747-300 (reg. HZ-AIO) suffered nose damage as it entered a monsoon drainage ditch while it was being taxied by maintenance staff from the hangar to the gate before a return flight to Saudi Arabia. None of the six crew members on board at the time were injured, but the aircraft was written off.
 On 8 September 2005, a Boeing 747 traveling from Colombo to Jeddah, carrying mostly Sri Lankan nationals to take up employment in the Kingdom, received a false alarm claiming that a bomb had been planted on board. The aircraft returned to Colombo. During the evacuation, there was a passenger stampede in the wake of which one Sri Lankan woman died, 62 were injured, and 17 were hospitalized. The aircraft had taken on a load of 420 passengers in Colombo. According to the Civil Aviation Authority of Sri Lanka, the probable cause was a "Breakdown of timely and effective communication amongst Aerodrome Controller and Ground Handling (SriLankan Airlines) personnel had prevented a timely dispatch of the stepladders to the aircraft to deplane the passengers in a timely manner, which resulted in the Pilot-In-Command to order an emergency evacuation of the passengers through slides after being alarmed by the bomb threat."
 On 25 May 2008, an Air Atlanta Icelandic aircraft operating for Saudia as Flight 810 (TF-ARS) from Prince Mohammad Bin Abdulaziz Airport, Madinah made an unscheduled landing at Zia International Airport (now Shahjalal International Airport), Dhaka. During the roll the tower controller reported that he saw a fire on the right hand wing. Upon vacating the runway, the crew received a fire indication for engine number three. The fire extinguisher was activated and all engines were shut down. The aircraft, a Boeing 747-357, which was damaged beyond repair, was successfully evacuated. Only minor injuries were incurred. Investigations revealed a fuel leak where the fuel enters the front spar for engine number three.
 On 5 January 2014, a leased Boeing 767 operating under Saudia was forced to make an emergency landing at Prince Mohammad bin Abdulaziz Airport in Medina after landing gear failed to deploy. 29 people were injured in the incident.
 On 5 August 2014, a Boeing 747-400 (reg. HZ-AIX) operating as flight 871 from Manila to Riyadh veered off the runway 24 of Ninoy Aquino International Airport in Manila while positioning for takeoff. No one on the plane or on ground were injured.
 On 11 November 2017, a MyCargo Airlines Boeing 747-400 freighter operated by Saudia Cargo (reg. TC-ACR) as flight SV916 from Maastricht (EHBK) to Jeddah (OEJN) veered off to the right of the runway during the takeoff roll in after a loss of thrust on the #4 engine caused by a compressor stall. The pilots did not immediately retard the thrust levers, and more standard procedures weren't followed as the plane swerved due to 'startle effect'.    The aircraft was repaired soon after. 
 On 21 May 2018, an Onur Air-leased Airbus A330-200 (reg TC-OCH), operating as flight 3818 from Medina to Dhaka, was diverted to Jeddah after suffering a malfunction with the nose landing gear. It was forced to make a belly landing. No injuries were reported.
 On 20 June 2022, a Boeing 777-368 operating as Flight 862 from Riyadh veered off and got stuck at a taxiway in Manila after landing. All 420 people on board were unharmed.

See also 

 Amaala International airport
 King Abdulaziz International airport
 Saudi Vision 2030

References

External links

 
 "Saudi Arabian Airlines: The Jewel of the Middle East", Boeing

 
1945 establishments in Saudi Arabia
Airlines established in 1945
Airlines of Saudi Arabia
Arab Air Carriers Organization members
Companies based in Jeddah
Government-owned airlines
Government-owned companies of Saudi Arabia
Saudi Arabian brands
SkyTeam